A mail sack or mailsack is a mail bag used to carry large quantities of mail.

Different handling and security requirements for different classes of mail is integral to the postal rate structure.

A mail sack is not a locked bag since they need little security. In contrast to a similar mailbag  referred to as a mail pouch (for more sensitive mail such as personal letters and military mail) that employs a locking mechanism on the top of the bag. A mail pouch has special closely spaced eyelets and a strong strap to secure the top where access into the bag is closed off and locked, where a mail sack has none of these features.

A Singapore judge held that mail sacks are considered to be part of the postal system and are protected by Chinese law; interference with them can be the subject of criminal prosecution.

Etymology 
According to Online Etymology Dictionary the etymology of "satchel" is mid 14th century from Old French sachel from Latin of saccellum (money bag, purse) and sacculus or saccus (bag or sack).
This etymology dictionary also describes "sack" as a large cloth bag. It says that sakkus is probably from Greek, from an early borrowing from Latin of saccus. It is also from Old French of sac, Spanish of saco, and Italian of sacco. It apparently is also from the Greek sakkos, from Semitic (cf. Hebrew saq "sack").

United States Postal Service

Second-class mail 
Second-class mail that would be carried in a mail sack is periodical publications issued at stated intervals and is issued a minimum of four times a year. This type of mail must have a date of issue and a consecutive numbering system. It also must have a real office where the publication comes from that is open during normal regular hours of business. The printed matter can not be stenciled, mimeographed or through a hectograph process. Second-class mail must be publications for distributing information of a public character (e.g., literature, sciences, industry information). The people that receive this second-class mail must be subscribers that are on some sort of list or in a customer database.

Third-class mail 
Third-class mail that would be carried in a mail sack is printed material weighing less than 16 ounces. Examples are circulars that are not of a personal nature (e.g. mass general public advertising, direct advertising mailing campaigns). Other third-class mail that would be carried in a mail sack is bulk mail that is presorted individually addressed letters that come in quantities of at least 50 pounds or mailings of over 200 pieces.

Fourth-class mail 
Fourth-class mail that would be carried in a mail sack is printed material weighing over 16 ounces. An example would be library books transferred through the interlibrary loan system.

M-bags, also called "Direct Sacks" 
A special type of mail sack is one that is used to transport bulk mail, particularly printed matter, to a single recipient at a single foreign address. There is no minimum weight, and the maximum is a tare weight of 66 lbs.  An M-bag is 4 feet tall and 36 inches in diameter.  Every piece of mail in an "M-bag must be marked 'Postage Paid - M-bag.'"

Foreign mail sack 
A mailbag used to transfer mail to a country other than the United States is defined as a "foreign mail sack". The normal design is that the top is closed with a drawstring like a leather strap. It is sealed using a lead seal (not a lock as in a mail pouch).

See also 

 Catcher pouch
 Diplomatic bag
 Mail bag
 Mail pouch
 Mail satchel
 Mochila
 Owney (dog)
 Portmanteau

Bibliography

Footnotes

Sources

Further reading

External links 

Bags
Philatelic terminology
Postal history
Postal services
Postal systems
Rail transportation in the United States
United States Postal Service

de:Postbeutel